Georgia competed at the 2019 World Aquatics Championships in Gwangju, South Korea from 12 to 28 July.

Diving

Georgia's diving team consisted of 2 athletes (2 male).

Men

Swimming

Georgia entered four swimmers.

Men

Women

References

Nations at the 2019 World Aquatics Championships
Georgia (country) at the World Aquatics Championships
2019 in Georgian sport